Abdurahmanov's pugolovka (Benthophilus abdurahmanovi) is a brackishwater fish of family Gobiidae. It is found in the northern Caspian Sea and the lower reaches of the rivers Volga and Terek. FishBase treats this taxa as a subspecies of  the  Azov tadpole goby (Benthophilus magistri abdurahmanovi.

The specific name honours Azerbaijani zoologist Yusif Abdurahmanov.

References

External links

 Benthophilus abdurahmanovi at FishWise

Benthophilus
Fish of Western Asia
Fish of the Caspian Sea
Fish of Russia
Endemic fauna of the Caspian Sea
Fish described in 1978